Bellas Artes is an underground metro station on the Line 5 of the Santiago Metro. It has platforms narrower than those of the older Santiago's metro stations and has only one exit. Chilean National Museum of Fine Arts, which is located on Parque Forestal, and Santa Lucía Hill are within walking distance from the station. The station was opened on 3 March 2000 as part of the extension of the line was extended from Baquedano to Santa Ana.

The name Bellas Artes is Spanish for Fine Arts, an allusion to the aforementioned museum.

Transantiago buses 
The station is surrounded by 4 bus stops (Stops 3 and 5 do not exist):

References

Santiago Metro stations
Railway stations opened in 2000
Santiago Metro Line 5